Veit Dietrich, also Vitus Theodorus or Vitus Diterichus, (8 December 1506 – 25 March 1549) was a German Lutheran theologian, writer and a reformer.

Life and work 
Veit Dietrich was born on 8 December 1506 in Nuremberg; his father was a shoemaker. The talent of the boy was soon recognized and patronage of a wealthy benefactor enabled him to attend high school at the University of Wittenberg. He enrolled in March 1522. In University Philipp Melanchthon recognized his talent and encouraged him.

Later, he was Martin Luther's housemate and a close confidant. As such he accompanied Luther to the Marburg Colloquy and stayed with him during the Diet of Augsburg in 1530 at the Fortress of Coburg. He earned a Master's degree in 1529 and taught in the art department. Later on he was offered a professorship in Wittenberg but he rejected it.

Works 
 Luther's Piety
 "Summaria", on the Old Testament
 "Summaria", on the New Testament
 He was also one of the editors of Luther's "Lectures on Genesis" and recorded parts of Luther's Table Talk

Literature 
 P. Meinhold: Die Genesis – Vorlesung Luthers und ihre Herausgeber. In: Forschungen zur Kirchen- u. Geistesgeschichte. Jahrgang 8, Stuttgart 1936.
 Bernhard Klaus: Veit Dietrich Leben und Werk. Nürnberg 1958
 Bernhard Klaus: Veit Dietrich. In: Fränkische Lebensbilder. Jahrgang 3, 1969, S. 141
 Marinus A. van den Broek: Sprichwort und Redensart in Veit Dietrichs 'Etliche Schriften für den gemeinen man'. Leuvense Bijdragen 75, 1986

External links 
 Dietrich Veit, Christian Cyclopedia
  Texte von Veit Dietrich in der Glaubensstimme

German Protestant Reformers
Academic staff of the University of Wittenberg
1506 births
1549 deaths
Clergy from Nuremberg
German male writers
16th-century Lutheran theologians